The White Cat (Swedish: Den vita katten is a 1950 Swedish mystery drama film directed by Hasse Ekman and starring Alf Kjellin, Eva Henning and Sture Lagerwall.

The film's sets were designed by the art director Bibi Lindström. It was shot on location around Stockholm.

Plot
A man arrives one night by train to Stockholm Central Station. The man has lost his memory. Newspapers report about an escaped insane sex offender, and the man dreads that it might be him.

In a café at the train station the man meets a waitress named Auri. She realizes that the man has no money and no place to go. He tells her about his situation. She offers to pay for his food and to take him home with her. The man, who calls himself X, and Auri start to trace his repressed memories and past life, while he dreads to find out why and what he fled.

Main cast
Alf Kjellin as "X", The man without identity  
Eva Henning as Auri Rautila, waitress 
Sture Lagerwall as Elias Sörbrunn, artist  
Gertrud Fridh as "Pax"
Hugo Björne as "Väglusen"
Ingrid Borthen as Ingeborg Eksell 
Gunnar Björnstrand as Jarl Eksell 
Gull Natorp as Otti Patkull 
Doris Svedlund as Girl in the school house  
Gösta Gustafson as Filip - the girls' father  
Margit Andelius as Ebba Patkull 
Stig Järrel as Algot
Peter Blitz as Jerker 
Arne Ragneborn as Thief at the Central station
Alf Östlund as Ticket collector

References

Bibliography 
 Per Olov Qvist & Peter von Bagh. Guide to the Cinema of Sweden and Finland. Greenwood Publishing Group, 2000.

External links

1950 films
Films directed by Hasse Ekman
1950s Swedish-language films
1950s mystery drama films
Films set in Stockholm
Swedish mystery drama films
1950 drama films
Swedish black-and-white films
1950s Swedish films